Sir Francis Hyde Villiers  (13 August 1852 – 18 November 1925) was a British civil servant and diplomat who was ambassador to Portugal and Belgium.

Career
The youngest son of George Villiers, 4th Earl of Clarendon, Francis Villiers was educated at Harrow School and entered the Foreign Office in 1870. He was appointed Acting Second Secretary in the Diplomatic Service in 1885, and served as Private Secretary to the Foreign Secretary, Lord Rosebery, in 1886 and 1892–94, and Acting Private Secretary to Lord Salisbury in 1887. From 1896 to 1905 he was Assistant Under Secretary at the Foreign Office. In 1906 he was appointed to be Minister to Portugal, and in 1911 he was transferred to be Minister to Belgium.

When the German army invaded Belgium in 1914 the Belgian Government retreated first to Antwerp and then to Le Havre (although King Albert remained in De Panne commanding the Belgian Army) and Villiers accompanied it until the end of the war, when he returned to Brussels. After the peace treaty had been signed, the British Legation at Brussels was raised to an Embassy and Villiers was promoted to Ambassador in October 1919. He retired in August 1920.

Honours
Francis Villiers was appointed CB in 1894, knighted KCMG in 1906 on his appointment to Portugal, given the additional knighthood of GCVO on the occasion of the King of Portugal's visit to England in 1909 and promoted GCMG in the New Year Honours of 1918. He was appointed to the Privy Council in August 1919.

The King of Portugal gave him the Grand Cross of the Order of Christ, and the King of the Belgians gave him the Grand Cross of the Order of Leopold.

Offices held

References
VILLIERS, Rt. Hon. Sir Francis Hyde, Who Was Who, A & C Black, 1920–2008; online edn, Oxford University Press, Dec 2007, retrieved 3 Sept 2012
Sir Francis Villiers, obituary, The Times, London, 19 November 1925, page 19
Rt. Hon. Sir Francis Hyde Villiers – thepeerage.com

External links

1852 births
1925 deaths
Francis Hyde Villiers
Younger sons of earls
People educated at Harrow School
Principal Private Secretaries to the Secretary of State for Foreign and Commonwealth Affairs
Ambassadors of the United Kingdom to Portugal
Ambassadors of the United Kingdom to Belgium
Knights Grand Cross of the Order of St Michael and St George
Knights Grand Cross of the Royal Victorian Order
Companions of the Order of the Bath
Members of the Privy Council of the United Kingdom
Grand Crosses of the Order of Christ (Portugal)